Zabari-ye Do (also Romanized as Zabārī-ye Do) is a village in Miyan Ab Rural District, in the Central District of Shushtar County, Khuzestan Province, Iran. At the 2006 census, its population was 33, in 5 families.

References 

Populated places in Shushtar County